Lonnie Theodore Binion (November 28, 1943 – September 17, 1998), or Ted Binion, was a wealthy American gambling executive and one of the sons of famed Las Vegas casino magnate Benny Binion, owner of Binion's Horseshoe. Ted Binion's death has been a subject of controversy; girlfriend Sandra Murphy and her lover Rick Tabish were initially charged and convicted in Binion's death, but were later granted a new trial and acquitted on the murder charges.

Early life
Ted Binion was born in Dallas, Texas, in 1943, to casino executive Benny Binion. He had an older brother, Jack, and three sisters: Becky, Brenda, and Barbara. Ted moved to Las Vegas, Nevada, with his father in 1946. He was involved early on in his father's casino, Binion's Horseshoe.

While growing up, Ted spent summers at the family's Montana retreat, a cattle ranch in Jordan, to work with the ranch hands. Later, in the early 1960s, Benny sent his three grandsons — his daughter Barbara’s sons — to Montana to work on the ranch. By the 1980s, Benny had amassed an  ranch, according to the county recorder’s office. The last parcel he purchased was in 1985. The family sold all the parcels in April 1998 to John Hillenbrand.

Career
In 1964, Benny regained full control of the Horseshoe after previously selling his interest to cover his legal costs in defending himself on tax evasion charges. Since he was a convicted criminal, Benny was no longer allowed to hold a gaming license. His sons Jack and Ted — aged only 23 and 21, respectively — took over the day-to-day operation of the casino while Benny remained on the payroll, assuming the title of Director of Public Relations. Jack became president of the Horseshoe, while Ted became casino manager. For the next thirty years, Ted Binion was the face that was most seen during the peak evening hours of the Horseshoe's casino operation and became well known as the host of the its poker tournaments. He loved living the high life and partying, schmoozing with high-profile guests of the Horseshoe and flirting with attractive women.

Binion was arrested in 1986 on drug trafficking charges and began drawing attention for his connection to organized crime figure Herbert "Fat Herbie" Blitzstein. The Nevada Gaming Control Board (GCB) also suspected that Binion was using his live-in girlfriend, Sandy Murphy, as a bagwoman. Binion had met Murphy while she was working at Cheetah's, a topless club. The relationship had caused Binion's estranged wife and daughter to pack up and leave for Texas. 

In 1996, the GCB provisionally banned Binion from any management role in the Horseshoe and he had to undergo regular drug testing. He was also banned from the casino's premises. Binion struggled to avoid running afoul of drug tests and, at one point, he shaved off all of his body hair in an attempt to circumvent a hair test that would reveal his history of usage. In May 1997, his gaming license was suspended when it was found that he had violated the drug testing agreement. In March 1998, after the GCB learned that Binion was associating with Blitzstein, it voted unanimously to permanently revoke his license. Binion was the first person to lose his license for violating a Nevada regulation that bans gaming licensees from associating with known criminals.

Inside the basement of the Horseshoe — housed in a floor-to-ceiling vault — was Binion's silver collection. When his ties to the family casino were severed, he was forced to move the collection from the casino property and was not allowed to be associated with the family business again.
After the revocation of his license and the sale of his family's Montana ranch, he became even more involved in drugs, especially marijuana, Xanax, and the street drug tar heroin, which he smoked; he was known to "chase the dragon" (inhale the smoke). Casino dealers had known when Ted was present due to the telltale odor of marijuana smoke whenever he used the eye in the sky to monitor the casino floor.

Personal life
In 1967, Binion was the target of a near-kidnapping plot. The alleged perpetrator, cabdriver and petty criminal Marvin Shumate was found dead, shot in the chest and in the head at the base of Sunrise Mountain on the east side of Las Vegas.

Binion was an avid reader of magazines and books. He was a history buff, particularly American Civil War history, and enjoyed watching History Channel and Discovery Channel programming. In addition, he was mathematically gifted - easily able to mentally calculate odds or the "house take" in gambling transactions with no aid. He was also known to help people he knew to be in difficult financial straits.

Buried treasure
The concrete bunker contained six tons of silver bullion, Horseshoe Casino chips, paper currency, and more than 100,000 rare coins, including Carson City silver dollars, many in mint condition. The rare coins were estimated to be worth between $7 million and $14 million, and were once housed in the Horseshoe casino's vault. The Pahrump underground vault would play a major role in the investigation into Binion's death.

After Binion was banned from the casino, he contracted construction of the vault with MRT Transport, a trucking company owned by Rick Tabish. MRT trucks were used to transport the silver to the vault, and the only two people who had the combination to the vault were Binion and Tabish. The vault was secured three days after Binion died, after Nye County sheriff's deputies discovered that Tabish and two other men were attempting to unearth the silver using an excavator and dump truck. 

Binion hid millions in and around his Las Vegas home, all of which went missing after his death. The riches are rumored to be buried on the property under odd mounds in the front and back yards. At the conclusion of the trial, much of Binion's silver was given to his daughter who had some of it offered for sale to the public. A large portion still remains unclaimed at the courthouse.

Death and aftermath
Binion was found dead on a small mattress on the floor of his Las Vegas estate home, 2408 Palomino Lane near Rancho Drive and Charleston Boulevard, on September 17, 1998. Empty pill bottles were found near the body, and an autopsy and toxicology report revealed that he died of a combination of the prescription sedative Xanax and heroin, with traces of Valium. The day before his death, Binion had purchased twelve pieces of tar heroin from a drug dealer and had gotten a prescription for Xanax from his next-door neighbor who was a doctor. Evidence introduced at trial showed that Binion personally took the prescription to a local pharmacy to be filled.

Binion's death was initially treated as a probable suicide. His live-in girlfriend, Sandy Murphy, said that he had been suicidal ever since he lost his gaming license a few months earlier. His sister Barbara, who was also afflicted with drug problems like her brother, had committed suicide from an overdose in 1983.
 This contributed to the perception that Binion could have been vulnerable to suicide as well. However, Binion's other sister, Becky, discounted any talk of suicide, saying that in her conversations with him he did not sound despondent.

Las Vegas homicide detectives suspected foul play in Binion's death, as his body did not show the typical signs of a drug overdose. While his stomach contained heroin, police thought that neither a heroin addict, nor someone attempting suicide, would take heroin in that manner. However, despite the urgings of Becky and Jack Binion, law enforcement officials refused to open a full-scale homicide investigation. Six months later, chief medical examiner Lary Simms ruled Binion had died of a heroin and Xanax overdose. A few weeks after that, however, the Clark County Coroner's office reclassified Ted's death a homicide on May 5, 1999. Although there were no specifics, law enforcement sources cited evidence that the death scene had been staged, as well as witness statements implicating Murphy and Tabish. Detectives had suspected for some time that Murphy and Tabish had been romantically involved and had learned that Binion suspected Murphy was cheating on him.

In June 1999, Murphy and Tabish were arrested for Binion's murder, as well as for conspiracy, robbery, grand larceny and burglary. The prosecution contended that Murphy and Tabish had conspired to kill Binion and steal his wealth, drugging him into unconsciousness and burking him, a form of manual suffocation. The suffocation theory was presented at trial by forensics pathologist Michael Baden, who testified for the prosecution. Baden postulated that Murphy and Tabish had resorted to suffocation because their effort to kill Binion by drugging him had taken too long, and that the pair feared discovery. Both Murphy and Tabish were charged with murder as well as burglary for attempting to remove Binion's silver fortune from its vault in Pahrump.

A police report that was not used in the first trial by Tabish's first attorney, Louie Palazzo, revealed that there was a drive-by shooting at the front of Binion's Las Vegas, Palomino Lane home on June 5, 1997. Included in the police report was a statement by Ted Binion alleging that Chance LeSueur and Benny Behnen (son of Ted's sister Becky Behnen) were the shooters.

Murder trial and re-trial

The trial of Murphy and Tabish attracted national media attention. In May 2000, after two months of trial and after nearly 68 hours of deliberation, Murphy and Tabish were found guilty. Tabish was sentenced to 25 years to life in prison, while Murphy received 22 years to life. Later that year, David Roger, who prosecuted the case, was elected Clark County district attorney, and David Wall, who second-chaired the prosecution, was elected district judge.

However, in July 2003, the Nevada Supreme Court overturned the murder convictions, ruling that Clark County District Court Judge Joseph Bonaventure erred in deliberation instructions to the jury. The justices found that Tabish should have received a separate trial regarding a previous charge against him for assaulting and extorting businessman Leo Casey. While the prosecution was never able to prove a link between the previous charge against Tabish and the Binion murder charge, the justices ruled that testimony regarding the previous charge had prejudiced the jury against both Tabish and Murphy. The justices also ruled that jurors should have been instructed to consider statements by Binion's estate attorney as statements of the attorney's mind, not fact.

The defendants were granted a new trial, which began on October 11, 2004 in Judge Bonaventure's courtroom. This time, Murphy was represented by Michael Cristalli, while Tabish was represented by Tony Serra and local Las Vegas attorney Joseph Caramagno.  Each was acquitted of murder, but both were convicted on lesser charges of burglary (12 to 60 months) and grand larceny (12 to 60 months). Tabish was also convicted for the use of a deadly weapon (18 to 60 months). Murphy was sentenced to time served and did not return to prison.

Tabish was originally sentenced to serve consecutive terms and was denied parole in 2001, 2004 and 2005. On January 26, 2009, he was brought into Las Vegas where the Nevada parole board granted him "Parole to Consecutive," meaning the three convictions were to run concurrently.

Tabish received another parole hearing in Las Vegas on January 13, 2010. The Nevada Board of Parole Commissioners announced January 26, 2010 that Tabish (then 44) would be granted parole. His younger brother described the news as "pretty wonderful".

Tabish was released on May 18, 2010. His parole started on April 2, 2010, but negotiating the terms of his release delayed his actual exit from prison.

Print and electronic media
The prosecution death theory, which the jury ultimately rejected, formed the basis for "Burked", a September 27, 2001 episode of the TV series CSI. The case was covered extensively in Death in the Desert, a biographical true crime book by author Cathy Scott, in Positively Fifth Street by James McManus, which is about a poker tournament at the Binion family's Horseshoe, and in An Early Grave by Gary C. King and released in 2001 as part of the "St. Martin's True Crime Classics" series. The case was also covered in the 2008 made-for-TV movie Sex and Lies in Sin City, originally said to be based on the book Murder in Sin City by columnist Jeff German which took the prosecution's point of view. However, the movie title and storyline were changed to allow for other theories about Binion's death. Las Vegas columnist John L. Smith published a pictorial summary of the case titled Quicksilver.

The cable TV network A&E aired an hour-long video about the case titled Who Wants to Kill a Millionaire, which is part of its "American Justice" series, and includes interviews and film clips of the characters surrounding Binion's death and aftermath.

The second edition of Death in the Desert, released in 2012, covers the re-trial and acquittals, as well as An Early Grave'''s re-release in 2005 with appendices about the re-trial and acquittals. Coverage can also be found at trutv.com under "Ted Binion" and in the 48 Hours Mystery episode "Buried Secrets of Las Vegas."

The TV show On the Case covered the case in its episode #12, aired November 22, 2009. It contains unique footage, including exclusive interviews with Sandra Murphy and shots of the histrionics of her lawyer Tony Serra during the second trial.

The seventh episode of the CBS legal comedy-drama The Defenders titled "Las Vegas v. Johnson" is a loosely depicted version of the trial.

References

External links
 Documentary series from Court TV (now TruTV) "Mugshots: Sandy Murphy - Death of a Casino King" episode (2009) at the FilmRise'' Youtube channel.

1943 births
1998 deaths
People from Dallas
Businesspeople from Las Vegas
American casino industry businesspeople
American poker players
World Series of Poker
People from Jordan, Montana
Drug-related deaths in Nevada